The 2010 House election in North Dakota took place on November 2, 2010 to elect the state's at-large Representative to the United States House of Representatives. Representatives are elected for two-year terms; this election was for the 112th Congress from January 3, 2011 until January 3, 2013. North Dakota has one seat in the House, apportioned according to the 2000 United States Census.

The election was held concurrently with the United States Senate elections of 2010 (including one in North Dakota), the United States House elections in other states and various state and local elections.

Background

Despite Republican dominance at the presidential level in North Dakota, which has not voted for a Democratic presidential candidate since 1964, as well as state and local elections, Democrats achieved several consecutive victories in Congressional elections in the state since the 1980s. Democrats had held the state's at-large House seat since 1981 when Incumbent Republican Representative Mark Andrews retired from the House of Representatives to run for and subsequently win election to the Senate in 1980. In 1986, Democrats gained North Dakota's Class III U.S. Senate seat in addition to having already held the state's Class I seat, thus giving Democrats control of both its U.S. Senate seats for the first time in North Dakota's history. From 1987 to 2011, North Dakota had a completely Democratic Congressional delegation. 

Since his first election in 1992, incumbent Democrat Earl Pomeroy had usually won reelection by comfortable margins. However with Democrats fighting in a much tougher political environment in 2010, Republicans planned on putting forward a serious challenge. Republicans running against him included state Public Service Commissioner Kevin Cramer, state Representative Rick Berg, and former University of Mary football coach Paul Schaffner. Pomeroy was likely more vulnerable than usual due to his support for the Democratic House Healthcare bill, which 64% of North Dakotans opposed, and President Barack Obama's declining job approval ratings in the state (of which 39% approve and 58% disapprove, with 45% strongly disapproving).

Candidates

Democrats
Earl Pomeroy, incumbent U.S. Representative

Republicans
Rick Berg, North Dakota State Representative and former state House Majority Leader
J.D. Donaghe, oil field consultant

Polling

†Internal poll (Garin-Hart-Yang for Pomeroy and Public Opinion Strategies for Berg)

Results

See also
North Dakota's at-large congressional district

References

External links
Elections and Voting at the North Dakota Secretary of State
U.S. Congress candidates for North Dakota at Project Vote Smart
2010 North Dakota General Election: Rick Berg (R) vs Earl Pomeroy (D) graph of multiple polls from Pollster.com

House - North Dakota from the Cook Political Report
North Dakota - At-Large from OurCampaigns.com
Campaign contributions from OpenSecrets
2010 North Dakota - 1st District from CQ Politics
Race profile at The New York Times
Debates
North Dakota House Debate on C-SPAN, October 4, 2010 (26:42)

2010 North Dakota elections
2010